Alfred Ramirez (born January 25, 1932) is an American former politician who served one term in the Kansas State Senate, as well as spending 10 years in the Kansas House of Representatives. Born near rural Zarah, Ramirez worked as a production supervisor for AT&T. In 1982, he was elected to the Kansas House, where he served 5 terms. In 1992, he ran for State Senate from the 5th district, and served a single term before leaving the State Senate in 1996; he was succeeded by Mark Gilstrap.

References

Republican Party Kansas state senators
20th-century American politicians
People from Bonner Springs, Kansas
1932 births
Possibly living people